Transmembrane protein 241 (aka C18orf45, hVVT) is a ubiquitous sugar transporter protein which in humans is encoded by the TMEM241 gene.

Gene 
In humans, TMEM241 is a 142,188 bp gene located at 18q11.2 which  contains 24 exons.

Gene Neighborhood 
TMEM241 is located near CABLES1, RIOK3, and NPC1 on chromosome 18.

mRNA 

The primary mRNA for human TMEM241, isoform 1, contains a 5' UTR hairpin loop conserved in primates. The primary mRNA for human TMEM241 isoform 1 contains binding sites in its 3' UTR for the miRNAs 520f-5p, 378a-5p, and 6866-5p.

Protein

General Properties 
There are over 10 transcript variants predicted for the human TMEM241 gene found on BLAST. TMEM241 Isoform 1 is approximately 31 kDa in mass. The protein has an isoelectric point of 8.7. and is particularly rich in the amino acid phenylalanine, containing twice the normal proportion of this amino acid.

Conserved Domains 

TMEM241 is composed of 9 transmembrane domains forming a  hydrophobic integral component of the membrane composed primarily of alpha helices. TMEM241 contains a VRG4 (Vanadate Resistant Glycosylation) domain with homology to the sugar transporter domain VRG4 from Saccharomyces cerevisiae (yeast).

Post-Translational Modification 

TMEM241 is predicted to undergo various phosphorylations, glycation, palmitoylation.  For example, TMEM241 isoform 1 has a phosphorylation sites on S6, 64, 170, 177, 291, 295 and 296; glycation sites on K125, 169 and 172; palmitoylation sites on C13, 15, 221.

Interacting Proteins 
There is some evidence that this protein may interact with keratin filament based on a two hybrid screen with the keratin protein KRT40.

Expression 

TMEM241 is likely to be expressed in all tissues at varying levels from basal to moderate expression. Some studies have found changes in the expression of TMEM241. For instance, in cases of acute megakaryoblastic leukemia, TMEM241 was found to be one of the most upregulated genes. In another case TMEM241 was found to be upregulated during the unfolded protein response following the overexpression of Ero1α (Endoplasmic Reticulum oxidoreduclin 1α).

Homology 
TMEM241 is conserved throughout eukaryotes.

Orthologs 
TMEM241 is conserved across all animals and homologs are found throughout eukaryotes. TMEM241 has 19% global identity and 60% identity to GDP-mannose transporter from S. cerevisiae, which contains the VRG4 domain. It is likely that TMEM241 is a GDP-mannose transporter due to this similarity. The graph on the right shows the relative level of conservation of TMEM241 across many species of organism using the principle of a Molecular Clock.

Paralogs 
TMEM241 has two paralogs in humans which have homologs throughout eukaryotes, UGTREL8 and UGTREL7. TMEM241, UGTREL8 and UGTREL7 are a family of sugar transport proteins with close identity to the GDP-mannose transporter identified in S. cerevisiae.

References

Further reading 

Genes on human chromosome 18